The 1948 United States presidential election in Missouri took place on November 2, 1948, as part of the 1948 United States presidential election. Voters chose 15 representatives, or electors, to the Electoral College, who voted for president and vice president.

Incumbent President Harry S. Truman, a native Missourian, won the state with 58.11% of the popular vote, against Republican Governor Thomas Dewey, with 41.49% of the popular vote. , this is the last election in which Moniteau County and Cole County voted for a Democratic presidential candidate.

Results

Results by county

See also
 United States presidential elections in Missouri

Notes

References

Missouri
1948
1948 Missouri elections